Mack J. Yoho (June 14, 1936 – September 14, 2020) was a former American and Canadian football player who played for the Ottawa Rough Riders and Buffalo Bills.

References

1936 births
2020 deaths
Players of American football from West Virginia
American football defensive ends
American football placekickers
Canadian football defensive linemen
Canadian football placekickers
Miami RedHawks football players
Ottawa Rough Riders players
Buffalo Bills players
Yale Bulldogs football coaches
American players of Canadian football
People from Wetzel County, West Virginia
American Football League players